Fearing is a surname. Notable people with the surname include:

 Dean Fearing (21st century), American chef
 Kenneth Fearing (1902–1961), American poet and writer
 Lillien Blanche Fearing (1863–1901), American lawyer and poet 
 Maria Fearing (1838–1937), Bible translator
 Paul Fearing (1762–1822), American politician
 Stephen Fearing (born 1963), Canadian folk singer-songwriter

Fictional characters:
 Patricia Fearing, a James Bond character

See also

 Fearing Pond
 Fearing Township, Washington County, Ohio, United States
 Fear (disambiguation)